Radu Mihnea (1586 – 13 January 1626) was Voivode (Prince) of Wallachia between September 1601 and March 1602, and again between March and May 1611, September 1611 and August 1616, August 1620 and August 1623, and Voivode (Prince) of Moldavia in 1616–1619, 1623–1626. He was the illegitimate son of Mihnea Turcitul by Voica Bratcul.

Modern-style prince & Family Man
Radu Mihnea spent part of his early years in Koper (Capodistria), on Mount Athos and in Greece. His stay in the Serenissima accounts for the pro-Venetian character of his rule and his interest in reforming the institutions of Wallachia and Moldavia. After completing his studies in Istanbul, Radu became prince of Wallachia at a very important time in Romanian history: following the union of the three principalities of Wallachia, Moldavia, and Transylvania under Michael the Brave. 

Radu would rule no less than four times in Wallachia and twice in Moldavia. He was loved due to his Renaissance style and love of the arts. This was due to his upbringing by the monks of Iveron at Mount Athos, Greece. Radu Mihnea died in 1626 in Moldavia, and his body was carried to Bucharest and interred at the Church of Prince Radu. The monastery was protected by the monks of Mount Athos due to Radu's loyalty to his educators.  Radu and his wife Arghira had five children, three boys and two girls. These five would be the last surviving direct descendants of Vlad III Dracula. The eldest was Alexandru Coconul.

He replaced Polish vassal Simion Movilă on the throne in Bucharest after the brief occupation of Wallachia by the troops of hetmans Jan Zamoyski and Jan Karol Chodkiewicz. His first rule in the country signified the return to Ottoman control, interrupted since Michael the Brave.

Radu appears to have been interested in a joint rule over Wallachia and Moldavia. He came closest to achieving it when his third rule over Moldavia was doubled by the reign of his son Alexandru Coconul in Wallachia. The subtlety of this gesture is discarded in several sources:
 
 Radulo, who is nowadays Prince in Moldavia, and his son [who is Prince] in Wallachia, [the latter] being very young and overseen by his father (Venetian document of April 11, 1625).
 Radulo Voivode, Prince of Wallachia and Moldavia (various documents).
 Radu Mihnea's tombstone bears the carving of both countries' seals.

Descendants
An article in a Romanian newspaper in the 1950s acknowledged the death of the last direct male descendant of Radu Mihnea Voda, Dumitru Radulescu(Radu)- a church, artist painter. However, it is not widely known that female descendants of Radu Mihnea do, in fact, still live in Bucharest. In fact, the bloodline extends as far as the 10th generation through the continuing lineage of the sister of Dumitru Radu, Rozalia Matilda Radulescu (Radu). She married a pharmacist Gheorghe Moraru and had five children, out of which only two survived, Matilda Virginia and Maria-Florica.

See also
Moldavian Magnate Wars

References
Magazin Istoric, 6/1979

External links
Cristian  Luca, "Influssi  occidentali  sull’atteggiamento  politico di  alcuni  principi  dei  Paesi  Romeni  nei  secoli  XVI  e  XVII"

Rulers of Moldavia
Rulers of Wallachia
1586 births
1626 deaths
Rulers of Moldavia and Wallachia